Semyonovskoye-Sovetskoye is a rural locality (a selo) in Seletskoye Rural Settlement, Suzdalsky District, Vladimir Oblast, Russia. The population was 9 as of 2010. There are 4 streets.

Geography 
Semyonovskoye-Sovetskoye is located 15 km southwest of Suzdal (the district's administrative centre) by road. Vysheslavskoye is the nearest rural locality.

References 

Rural localities in Suzdalsky District